Johann Heinrich Keller (1692–1765) was an 18th-century painter from Switzerland active in the Northern Netherlands.

Biography
He was born in Zurich and was first the pupil of his father Johann Keller, a sculptor. He moved to The Hague and became the teacher of Dirk van der Aa and Cornelis Kuipers. He is known for his wall decorations and in 1751 he worked in The Hague on wall decorations for a mansion on the Lange Voorhout, now called the Escher Museum. In 1753 he made wall decorations for what is now Het Loo Palace.

He died in The Hague.

References

Johann Heinrich Keller on Artnet

1692 births
1765 deaths
Swiss painters
18th-century Dutch painters
18th-century Dutch male artists
Dutch male painters
Artists from Zürich